The  Asian Baseball Championship was the fifth continental tournament held by the Baseball Federation of Asia. The tournament was held in Seoul, South Korea for the first time, and was won by the hosts for their first Asian Championship. Japan and Taiwan shared second place, the first time that a medal position had been shared in the tournament's history. Philippines were the other participants.

References

Bibliography 
 

1963
1963
Asian Baseball Championship
1963 in South Korean sport
Sports competitions in Seoul
1960s in Seoul